Oxford University Press (OUP) is the university press of the University of Oxford. It is the largest university press in the world, and its printing history dates back to the 1480s. Having been officially granted the legal right to print books by decree in 1586, it is the second oldest university press after Cambridge University Press.

It is a department of the University of Oxford and is governed by a group of 15 academics known as the Delegates of the Press, who are appointed by the vice-chancellor of the University of Oxford. The Delegates of the Press are led by the Secretary to the Delegates, who serves as OUP's chief executive and as its major representative on other university bodies. Oxford University Press has had a similar governance structure since the 17th century. The press is located on Walton Street, Oxford, opposite Somerville College, in the inner suburb of Jericho.

For the last 500 years, OUP has primarily focused on the publication of pedagogical texts and continues this tradition today by publishing academic journals, dictionaries, English language resources, bibliographies, books on indology, music, classics, literature, history, as well as bibles and atlases.

OUP has offices throughout the world, primarily in locations that were once part of the British Empire (mainly India and the United States).

History

The University of Oxford began printing around 1480 and grew into a major printer of bibles, prayer books, and scholarly works. Oxford's chancellor, Archbishop William Laud, consolidated the legal status of the university's printing in the 1630s and petitioned Charles I for rights that would enable Oxford to compete with the Stationers' Company and the King's Printer. He obtained a succession of royal grants and Oxford's "Great Charter" in 1636 gave the university the right to print "all manner of books". Laud also obtained the "privilege" from the Crown of printing the King James or Authorized Version of Scripture at Oxford. This "privilege" created substantial returns in the next 250 years.

Following the English Civil War, Vice-chancellor, John Fell, Dean of Christ Church, Bishop of Oxford, and Secretary to the Delegates was determined to installed printing presses in 1668, making it the university's first central print shop. In 1674 OUP began to print a broadsheet calendar, known as the Oxford Almanack, that has been produced annually without interruption from Fell's time to the present day. Fell drew up the first formal programme for the university's printing which envisaged hundreds of works, including the Bible in Greek, editions of the Coptic Gospels and works of the Church Fathers, texts in Arabic and Syriac, comprehensive editions of classical philosophy, poetry, and mathematics, a wide range of medieval scholarship, and also "a history of insects, more perfect than any yet Extant."

Generally speaking, the early 18th century marked a lull in the press's expansion. It suffered from the absence of any figure comparable to Fell. The business was rescued by the intervention of a single Delegate, William Blackstone. Disgusted by the chaotic state of the press, and antagonized by the Vice-Chancellor George Huddesford, Blackstone called for sweeping reforms that would firmly set out the Delegates' powers and obligations, officially record their deliberations and accounting, and put the print shop on an efficient footing. Nonetheless, Randolph ignored this document, and it was not until Blackstone threatened legal action that changes began. The university had moved to adopt all of Blackstone's reforms by 1760.

By the late 18th century, the press had become more focused. In 1825 the Delegates bought land in Walton Street. Buildings were constructed from plans drawn up by Daniel Robertson and Edward Blore, and the press moved into them in 1830. This site remains the main office of OUP in the 21st century, at the corner of Walton Street and Great Clarendon Street, northwest of Oxford city centre.

The press now entered an era of enormous change. In 1830, it was still a joint-stock printing business in an academic backwater, offering learned works to a relatively small readership of scholars and clerics  At this time, Thomas Combe joined the press and became the university's Printer until his death in 1872. Combe was a better business man than most Delegates, but still no innovator: he failed to grasp the huge commercial potential of India paper, which grew into one of Oxford's most profitable trade secrets in later years. Even so, Combe earned a fortune through his shares in the business and the acquisition and renovation of the bankrupt paper mill at Wolvercote. Combe showed little interest, however, in producing fine printed work at the press. The most well-known text associated with his print shop was the flawed first edition of Alice's Adventures in Wonderland, printed by Oxford at the expense of its author Lewis Carroll (Charles Lutwidge Dodgson) in 1865.

It took the 1850 Royal Commission on the workings of the university and a new Secretary, Bartholomew Price, to shake up the press. Appointed in 1868, Price had already recommended to the university that the press needed an efficient executive officer to exercise "vigilant superintendence" of the business, including its dealings with Alexander Macmillan, who became the publisher for Oxford's printing in 1863 and in 1866 helped Price to create the Clarendon Press series of cheap, elementary school books – perhaps the first time that Oxford used the Clarendon imprint. Under Price, the press began to take on its modern shape. Major new lines of work began. To give one example, in 1875, the Delegates approved the series Sacred Books of the East under the editorship of Friedrich Max Müller, bringing a vast range of religious thought to a wider readership.

Equally, Price moved OUP towards publishing in its own right. The press had ended its relationship with Parker's in 1863 and in 1870 bought a small London bindery for some Bible work. Macmillan's contract ended in 1880, and wasn't renewed. By this time, Oxford also had a London warehouse for Bible stock in Paternoster Row, and in 1880 its manager Henry Frowde (1841–1927) was given the formal title of Publisher to the university. Frowde came from the book trade, not the university, and remained an enigma to many. One obituary in Oxford's staff magazine The Clarendonian admitted, "Very few of us here in Oxford had any personal knowledge of him." Despite that, Frowde became vital to OUP's growth, adding new lines of books to the business, presiding over the massive publication of the Revised Version of the New Testament in 1881 and playing a key role in setting up the press's first office outside Britain, in New York City in 1896.

Price transformed OUP. In 1884, the year he retired as Secretary, the Delegates bought back the last shares in the business. The press was now owned wholly by the university, with its own paper mill, print shop, bindery, and warehouse. Its output had increased to include school books and modern scholarly texts such as James Clerk Maxwell's A Treatise on Electricity & Magnetism (1873), which proved fundamental to Einstein's thought. Simply put, without abandoning its traditions or quality of work, Price began to turn OUP into an alert, modern publisher. In 1879, he also took on the publication that led that process to its conclusion: the huge project that became the Oxford English Dictionary (OED).

Offered to Oxford by James Murray and the Philological Society, the "New English Dictionary" was a grand academic and patriotic undertaking. Lengthy negotiations led to a formal contract. Murray was to edit a work estimated to take 10 years and to cost approximately £9,000. Both figures were wildly optimistic. The Dictionary began to appear in print in 1884, but the first edition was not completed until 1928, 13 years after Murray's death, at a cost of around £375,000. This vast financial burden and its implications landed on Price's successors.

The next Secretary, Philip Lyttelton Gell, was appointed by the Vice-Chancellor Benjamin Jowett in 1884 but struggled and was finally dismissed in 1897. The Assistant Secretary, Charles Cannan, took over with little fuss and even less affection for his predecessor: "Gell was always here, but I cannot make out what he did." Charles Cannan, who had been instrumental in Gell's removal, succeeded Gell in 1898.

By the early 20th century OUP expanded its overseas trade, in part due to the efforts of Humphrey Milford, the publisher to the University of Oxford from 1913 to 1945. The 1920s saw skyrocketing prices of both materials and labour. Paper especially was hard to come by, and had to be imported from South America through trading companies. Economies and markets slowly recovered as the 1920s progressed. In 1928, the press's imprint read 'London, Edinburgh, Glasgow, Leipzig, Toronto, Melbourne, Cape Town, Bombay, Calcutta, Madras and Shanghai'. Not all of these were full-fledged branches: in Leipzig there was a depot run by H. Bohun Beet, and in Canada and Australia there were small, functional depots in the cities and an army of educational representatives penetrating the rural fastnesses to sell the press's stock as well as books published by firms whose agencies were held by the press, very often including fiction and light reading. In India, the Branch depots in Bombay, Madras, and Calcutta were imposing establishments with sizable stock inventories, for the Presidencies themselves were large markets, and the educational representatives there dealt mostly with upcountry trade. The Depression of 1929 dried profits from the Americas to a trickle, and India became 'the one bright spot' in an otherwise dismal picture. Bombay was the nodal point for distribution to the Africas and onward sale to Australasia, and people who trained at the three major depots moved later on to pioneer branches in Africa and South East Asia.

In 1923 OUP established a Music Department. At the time, such musical publishing enterprises, however, were rare. and few of the Delegates or former Publishers were themselves musical or had extensive music backgrounds. OUP bought an Anglo-French Music Company and all its facilities, connections, and resources. This concentration provided OUP two mutually reinforcing benefits: a niche in music publishing unoccupied by potential competitors, and a branch of music performance and composition that the English themselves had largely neglected. Hinnells proposes that the early Music Department's "mixture of scholarship and cultural nationalism" in an area of music with largely unknown commercial prospects was driven by its sense of cultural philanthropy (given the press's academic background) and a desire to promote "national music outside the German mainstream."
It was not until 1939 that the Music Department showed its first profitable year.

The period following World War II saw consolidation in the face of the breakup of the Empire and the post-war reorganization of the Commonwealth.

In the 1960s OUP Southern Africa started publishing local authors, for the general reader, but also for schools and universities, under its Three Crowns Books imprint. Its territory includes Botswana, Lesotho, Swaziland and Namibia, as well as South Africa, the biggest market of the five. OUP Southern Africa is now one of the three biggest educational publishers in South Africa, and focuses its attention on publishing textbooks, dictionaries, atlases and supplementary material for schools, and textbooks for universities. Its author base is overwhelmingly local, and in 2008 it entered into a partnership with the university to support scholarships for South Africans studying postgraduate degrees.

In the years 1927-1934 Oxford University Press, Inc., New York was reorganised by Geoffrey Cumberlege to bring it back to profitability after the Depression years (in 1945-1956 he would succeed Milford as publisher to the University of Oxford). Today the North American branch in New York City is primarily a distribution branch to facilitate the sale of Oxford Bibles in the United States. It also handles marketing of all books of its parent, Macmillan. By the end of 2021, OUP USA has published eighteen Pulitzer Prize–winning books.

Operations in South Asia and East and South East Asia were and, in the case of the former, remain major parts of the company.

In July 2020, during the COVID-19 pandemic its Bookshop on the High Street closed.

On 27 August 2021, OUP closed Oxuniprint, its printing division. The closure will mark the "final chapter" of OUP's centuries-long history of printing.

Museum 
The Oxford University Press Museum is located on Great Clarendon Street, Oxford. Visits must be booked in advance and are led by a member of the archive staff. Displays include a 19th-century printing press, the OUP buildings, and the printing and history of the Oxford Almanack, Alice in Wonderland and the Oxford English Dictionary.

Clarendon Press 
OUP came to be known as "(The) Clarendon Press" when printing moved from the Sheldonian Theatre to the Clarendon Building in Broad Street in 1713. The name continued to be used when OUP moved to its present site in Oxford in 1830. The label "Clarendon Press" took on a new meaning when OUP began publishing books through its London office in the early 20th century. To distinguish the two offices, London books were labelled "Oxford University Press" publications, while those from Oxford were labelled "Clarendon Press" books. This labelling ceased in the 1970s, when the London office of OUP closed. Today, OUP reserves "Clarendon Press" as an imprint for Oxford publications of particular academic importance.

Scholarly journals 
OUP as Oxford Journals has also been a major publisher of academic journals, both in the sciences and the humanities;  it publishes more than 500 journals on behalf of learned societies around the world. It has been noted as one of the first university presses to publish an open access journal (Nucleic Acids Research), and probably the first to introduce Hybrid open access journals, offering "optional open access" to authors to allow all readers online access to their paper without charge. The "Oxford Open" model applies to the majority of their journals. The OUP is a member of the Open Access Scholarly Publishers Association.

Series and titles  

Oxford University Press publishes a variety of dictionaries (e.g. Oxford English Dictionary, Shorter Oxford English Dictionary, Compact Oxford English Dictionary, Compact Editions of the Oxford English Dictionary, Compact Oxford English Dictionary of Current English, Concise Oxford English Dictionary, Oxford Dictionary of Marketing, Oxford Advanced Learner's Dictionary), English as a second or foreign language resources (e.g. Let's Go), English language exams (e.g. Oxford Test of English and the Oxford Placement Test), bibliographies (e.g. Oxford Bibliographies Online), miscellaneous series such as Very Short Introductions, and books on Indology, music, classics, literature, history, Bibles, and atlases. Many of these are published under the Oxford Languages brand.

Clarendon Scholarships 
Since 2001, Oxford University Press has financially supported the Clarendon bursary, a University of Oxford graduate scholarship scheme.

Controversies

Tehran Book Fair Controversy
In February 1989, Iran's Ayatollah Khomeini issued a fatwa urging the execution of British author Salman Rushdie, and of all involved in the publication of his novel The Satanic Verses. Rushdie went into hiding, and there began an international movement to boycott book trading with Iran. There was therefore outrage when in April 1989 OUP broke the world-wide embargo and chose to attend the Tehran Book Fair. OUP justified this with the statement that "We deliberated about it quite deeply but felt it certainly wasn't in our interests, or Iran's as a whole, to stay away." The New York Times, International Herald Tribune and the Sunday Times all condemned Oxford's decision.

Malcolm vs Oxford University 1986-1992
In 1990 in the UK Court of Appeal author Andrew Malcolm won a landmark legal judgment against Oxford University (Press) for its breach of a contract to publish his philosophical text Making Names. Reporting on the verdict in The Observer, Laurence Marks wrote, "It is the first time in living memory that Grub Street has won such a victory over its oppressors". The Appeal Court judges were highly critical of Oxford's conduct of the affair and of the litigation. Lord Justice Mustill declared "The Press is one of the longest-established publishing houses in the United Kingdom, and no doubt in the world. They must have been aware from the outset that the absence of agreement on the matters in question [the book's print-run and format] was not, in the trade, regarded as preventing a formal agreement from coming into existence. Candour would, I believe, have required that this should have been made clear to the judge and ourselves, rather than a determined refusal to let the true position come to light... This is not quite all. I do not know whether an outsider studying the history of this transaction and of this litigation would feel that, in his self-financed struggle with the assembled Chancellor, Masters and Scholars of the University of Oxford the appellant has had a fair crack of the whip. I certainly do not... Mr Charkin took the decision [to renege on the OUP editor's contract], not because he thought the book was no good - he had never seen it and the reports were favourable - but because he thought it would not sell. Let there be no mistake about it, the failure of this transaction was about money, not prestige. Nor does the course of the litigation give any reason to suppose that the Press had any interest but to resist the claim, no matter on what grounds, so long as they succeeded." Lord Justice Leggatt added: "It is difficult to know what the Deputy Judge (Lightman) meant by a 'firm commitment' other than an intention to create legal relations. Nothing short of that would have had any value whatever for Mr Malcolm... To suggest that Mr Hardy intended to induce Mr Malcolm to revise the book by giving him a valueless assurance would be tantamount to an imputation of fraud... It follows that in my judgment when Mr Hardy used the expressions 'commitment' and 'a fair royalty' he did in fact mean what he said; and I venture to think that it would take a lawyer to arrive at any other conclusion. There was therefore an enforceable contract for the publication of Mr Malcolm's book... The Respondents' final statement may be thought unworthy of them.”

The case ended in July 1992 with a Tomlin order, a damages settlement under the terms of which the servants and agents of Oxford University are permanently barred from denigrating Malcolm or Making Names, rendering it the first book in literary history to be afforded such legal protection. The case was reported to have cost Oxford over £500,000.

Closure of Poetry List
In November 1998, the OUP announced the closure, on commercial grounds, of its modern poetry list. Andrew Potter, OUP's director of music, trade paperbacks and Bibles, told The Times that the list "just about breaks even. The university expects us to operate on commercial grounds, especially in this day and age."  In the same article, the poet D. J. Enright, who had been with OUP since 1979 said, "There was no warning. It was presented as a fait accompli. Even the poetry editor didn't know....The money involved is peanuts. It's a good list, built up over many years." In February 1999, Arts Minister Alan Howarth made a speech in Oxford in which he denounced the closure: "OUP is not merely a business. It is a department of the University of Oxford and has charitable status. It is part of a great university, which the Government supports financially and which exists to develop and transmit our intellectual culture....It is a perennial complaint by the English faculty that the barbarians are at the gate. Indeed they always are. But we don't expect the gatekeepers themselves, the custodians, to be barbarians." Oxford's professor Valentine Cunningham wrote in the Times Higher Education Supplement: "Increasingly, (OUP) has behaved largely like a commercial outfit, with pound signs in its eyes and a readiness to dumb down for the sake of popularity and sales....Sacking poets not because they lose money but because they do not make enough of it: it is an allegory of a university press missing the point, mistaking its prime purpose." In March 1999 The Times Literary Supplement commissioned Andrew Malcolm to write an article under the strapline “Why the present constitution of the OUP cannot work”. A decade later, OUP's managing director, Ivon Asquith, reflected on the public relations damage caused by the episode: "If I had foreseen the self-inflicted wound we would suffer I would not have let the proposal get as far as the Finance Committee."

Tax Exemption Controversy
Since the 1940s, both OUP and the Cambridge University Press (CUP), had made applications to the Inland Revenue for exemption from corporate tax. The first application, by CUP in 1940, was refused "on the ground that, since the Press was printing and publishing for the outside world and not simply for the internal use of the University, the Press's trade went beyond the purpose and objects of the University and (in terms of the Act) was not exercised in the course of the actual carrying out of a primary purpose of the University." Similar applications by OUP in 1944 and 1950 were also rejected by the Inland Revenue, whose officers repeatedly pointed out that the university presses were in open competition with commercial, tax-liable publishers. In November 1975 CUP's chief executive Geoffrey Cass again applied to the Inland Revenue, and a year later CUP's tax-exemption was quietly conceded. OUP's Chief Executive George Richardson followed suit in 1977 and OUP's tax-exemption was granted in 1978. The decisions were not made public. The issue was only brought to public attention as a result of press interest in OUP, following the poetry list closure controversy. In 1999, the campaigner Andrew Malcolm published his second book The Remedy, in which he alleged that OUP is in breach of its 1978 tax-exemption conditions. This was reported in a front page article in The Oxford Times, along with OUP's response.

In March 2001, after a 28-year battle with the Indian tax authorities, OUP lost its tax exemption in India. The Supreme Court ruled that OUP was not tax exempt in the subcontinent "because it does not carry out any university activities there but acts simply as a commercial publisher". In order to pay off back taxes, owed since the 1970s, OUP was obliged to sell its Mumbai headquarters building, Oxford House. The Bookseller reported that "The case has again raised questions about OUP's status in the UK". In 2003, Joel Rickett of The Bookseller] wrote an article in The Guardian describing the resentment of commercial rivals at OUP's tax exemption. Rickett accurately predicted that the funds which would have been paid in tax were "likely to be used to confirm OUP's dominance by buying up other publishers."(Between 1989 and 2018, OUP bought out over 70 rival book and journal publishers). In 2007, with the new 'public benefit' requirement of the revised Charities Act, the issue was re-examined  with particular reference to the OUP. In 2008, CUP's and OUP's privilege was attacked by rival publishers. In 2009 The Guardian invited Andrew Malcolm to write an article on the subject.

East African Bribery Scandal
In July 2012, the UK's Serious Fraud Office found OUP's branches in Kenya and Tanzania guilty of bribery to obtain school bookselling contracts sponsored by the World Bank. Oxford was fined £1.9 million "in recognition of sums it received which were generated through unlawful conduct" and barred from applying for World Bank-financed projects for three years.

See also 

 :Category:Oxford University Press academic journals
 List of Oxford University Press journals
 Hachette
 Hart's Rules for Compositors and Readers at the University Press, Oxford
 List of largest UK book publishers
 Cambridge University Press v. Patton, a copyright infringement suit in which OUP is a plaintiff
 Harvard University Press
 University of Chicago Press
 Edinburgh University Press
 Express Publishing
 Blavatnik School of Government (opened in 2015), opposite the OUP on Walton Street

References

Citations

Sources

Further reading 
 Gadd, Ian, ed. (2014). The History of Oxford University Press: Volume I: Beginnings to 1780. Oxford: OUP. .
 Eliot, Simon, ed. (2014). The History of Oxford University Press: Volume II: 1780 to 1896. Oxford: OUP. .
 Louis, Wm. Roger, ed. (2014). The History of Oxford University Press: Volume III: 1896 to 1970. Oxford: OUP. . Also online .
 Robbins, Keith, ed. (2017). The History of Oxford University Press: Volume IV: 1970 to 2004. Oxford: OUP. .

External links 

Illustrated article: The Most Famous Press in the World, World's Work and Play, June 1903

 
1586 establishments in England
1896 establishments in New York City
Book publishing companies of England
Book publishing companies based in New York (state)
University presses of the United Kingdom
Departments of the University of Oxford
Sheet music publishing companies
Shops in Oxford
Museums in Oxford
Literary museums in England
Publishing companies established in the 16th century
Organizations established in the 1580s
Companies based in Oxford
Reference publishers
Academic publishing companies